Arebilachi  is a village in the southern state of Karnataka, India. It is located in the Bhadravati taluk of Shimoga district in Karnataka.The village has  a PHC (Primary Health care ) which is one of the largest in the state covering for a population of 20,000 people of all  surrounding villages. 

Notable People 

H .P Melappa was a bhadravati taluk board president during 1967-1972

Demographics
As of 2001 India census, Arebilachi had a population of 5502 with 2816 males and 2686 females.

See also
 Shimoga
 Districts of Karnataka

References

External links
 http://Shimoga.nic.in/

Villages in Shimoga district